Snowdrops is a novel by A. D. Miller which was shortlisted for the 2011 Man Booker Prize.

Plot
The novel is set in Moscow in the early 2000s and is written in the form of first-person narrative by the protagonist, Nicholas, a British, Moscow-based commercial lawyer. Nicholas gets involved with two Russian girls, Masha, with whom he is romantically involved, and Katya. The liaison sees Nicholas Platt drawn into the underworld of Russia, as a plot unfolds around him, and his new relationship. The novel is written in a confessional style, leading up to the criminal act into which Nicholas has been drawn.

Miller has described Snowdrops as a "moral thriller", because the reader knows that something bad is going to happen, but is not exactly sure what.

Reception
The book received generally positive review, with The Guardian writing Snowdrops is a properly moral riposte to that attitude; a powerful warning of the dangers of staring at something so long that you stop noticing what you're seeing.

References 

2011 British novels
British thriller novels
Novels set in Moscow
Novels set in the 2000s
Atlantic Books books